Furness College is a college of further education in Barrow-in-Furness, Cumbria. It provides a wide range of A levels, vocational education and skills training to over 16s, notably working with BAE Systems to train apprentices for their shipyard in Barrow. The college also offers courses for adults, and runs HNDs and other higher education programmes including foundation degrees, degrees and master's degrees, for which it achieved Teaching Excellence Framework silver status in June 2017. It is the only college in Barrow and the largest further education college in Cumbria. On 1 August 2016, Furness College merged with Barrow Sixth Form College.

In August 2016, Furness College gained chartered college status when it became a member of the Chartered Institution for Further Education. This membership is awarded to the higher performing further education colleges and training providers in the UK. The college is also a member of the National Skills Academy for Nuclear.

Profile
Furness College is a further education college based on two campuses in Barrow-in-Furness in Cumbria. It is the largest provider of education and training in south Cumbria offering a wide range of vocational courses to its students. The college has over 1400 students aged 16–18, and over 700 adult students. In addition, over 1000 apprentices are trained through the college each year.

The college currently has over 500 students studying degrees and other higher education courses. The degrees are validated by Lancaster University, the University of Central Lancashire and the University of Cumbria.

Campuses

The college underwent a campus transformation with a £42 million rebuild which opened in 2012. The remodelled campus provides the people of Furness and South Cumbria with an educational environment where their experience of study will be related to the real world. The building provides workshops, salons, restaurant and a dedicated university centre. A major new part of this project was the development of the college's sport facilities to house a dedicated gym and an all-weather sports pitch.

In August 2016, the college opened a new Advanced Manufacturing and Technology Centre on the Channelside campus to accommodate its growing number of engineering students, including those studying on higher education courses. The building finished first in the 'Cumbria and Isle of Man' category of the BBC People's Choice award for 'North West Building of the Decade'.

As a result of the college's merger with Barrow Sixth Form College on 1 August 2016, the college has a second campus at Rating Lane in Barrow-in-Furness. This campus was opened in 1979 to replace existing school sixth form provision in the town's two grammar schools which have subsequently closed.

Merger

On 1 August 2016, Furness College underwent a 'type B' merger with Barrow Sixth Form College. The Sixth Form College received a financial notice to improve in January 2016 from the Education Funding Agency and was deemed no longer to be financially viable due to its inadequate financial health. As a result, merger discussions between the two colleges continued and on 1 August 2016, the corporation of Barrow Sixth Form College was dissolved and its assets and liabilities transferred to Furness College.

The college will continue to operate on both campuses, which are approximately three miles apart, retaining both the Furness College and Sixth Form College brands. Both A level and technical/professional courses will continue, with further expansion of the curriculum planned for future years where there may be opportunities for students to study a 'blended' curriculum offer. A level provision is predominantly offered at the college's Rating Lane campus with technical and professional qualifications mainly delivered at the Channelside campus.

Courses
Furness College offers a wide range of vocational courses which can be studied on a part-time or full-time basis.
 Full- and part-time courses - the college runs a large range of technical and professional courses for young people and adults, including T levels from 2021.
 Full-time A level courses.
 Business Development - the college works with the local business community to provide bespoke training courses.
 School Leavers - a wide range of full-time courses are available from Art & Design through to Engineering, Health & Social Care, Sport and lots more.
 Apprenticeships - Furness College currently trains over 1000 apprentices and works with over 400 employers.
 Higher Education - from foundation degrees to master's degrees in a range of subject areas.

Ofsted Inspection
In March 2019, the college underwent a full Ofsted inspection which was its first Ofsted inspection since the merger between Furness College and Barrow Sixth Form College in August 2016. Inspectors judged the college to be a good (grade 2) college with good provision in all main judgement areas.

Student Union
The Furness College Students' Union is affiliated to the National Union of Students, and all students of all Furness College campuses are entitled to membership. The college also offers extensive academic and pastoral support to all its students.

Leadership and Management
The college is led by the senior leadership team under the direction and scrutiny of the Board of the Corporation which is also responsible for overseeing the strategic direction of the college. Jan Fielding is the current Chair of Governors and Andrew Wren is the Principal and Chief Executive of Furness College, including Barrow Sixth Form College.

South Cumbria Multi-Academy Trust

In 2021, Furness College led the formation of a multi-academy trust to operate in its catchment area. The trust, named South Cumbria Multi-Academy Trust, admitted its first member, Chetwynde School in Barrow-in-Furness, on 1 September, 2021. Its vision is to inspire young people and change lives through excellence in education in South Cumbria. The trust is currently accepting applications from other schools who are looking to join a trust.

The trust's Chief Executive Officer is Furness College's Principal/Chief Executive, Andrew Wren.

Former teachers
 Richard Parsons, English educational study guide author.

References

External links
 Official Website

Education in Barrow-in-Furness
Buildings and structures in Barrow-in-Furness
Further education colleges in Cumbria